Whipsnade Zoo, formerly known as ZSL Whipsnade Zoo and Whipsnade Wild Animal Park, is a zoo and safari park located at Whipsnade, near Dunstable in Bedfordshire, England. It is one of two zoos (the other being London Zoo in Regent's Park, London) that are owned by the Zoological Society of London (ZSL), a charity devoted to the worldwide conservation of animals and their habitats.

Description

Due to its size, inside the park, visitors may walk, use the zoo's bus service, or drive their own cars between the various animal enclosures, or through an 'Asian' area where some animals are allowed to roam free around the cars. There is also a train service, the  narrow gauge Great Whipsnade Railway, also known as the "Jumbo Express."

Whipsnade Zoo is the UK's largest zoo and one of Europe's largest wildlife conservation parks. It is home to 3,626 animals, many of which are endangered in the wild. The majority of the animals are kept within sizeable enclosures; others, such as Peafowl, Patagonian Maras, and Red-necked Wallabies, roam freely around the park.

History

Early years
The Zoological Society of London was founded in 1826 by Sir Stamford Raffles with the aim of promoting the worldwide conservation of animals and their habitats. To this end London Zoo in Regents Park, London was established.

Almost 100 years later, Sir Peter Chalmers Mitchell (ZSL Secretary 1903–1935) was inspired by a visit to the Bronx Zoological Park to create a park in Britain as a conservation centre.

Hall Farm, a derelict farm on the Dunstable Downs,  to the north of London was purchased by the Zoological Society of London in 1926 for £13,480 12s 10d. The site was fenced, roads built and trees planted.

The first animals arrived at the park in 1928, including two Lady Amherst's pheasants, a golden pheasant, and five red junglefowl. Others soon followed including muntjac, llama, wombats and skunks.

Whipsnade Park Zoo opened on Sunday 23 May 1931. It was the first open zoo in Europe to be easily accessible to the visiting public. It was an immediate success and received over 38,000 visitors on the following Monday. The brown bear enclosure is a surviving feature from the earliest days of the zoo.

The collection of animals was boosted in 1932 by the purchase of a collection from a defunct travelling menagerie and some of the larger animals walked to the zoo from Dunstable station.

The distinctive white lion hill figure was completed in 1933 and refreshed in 2018.

World War II

During the Second World War, the zoo acted as a refuge for animals evacuated from the Regents Park London Zoo. The celebrity giant pandas Ming, Sung and Tang were among these animals but were soon returned to London to boost morale in the capital. During 1940, 41 bombs fell on the park with little damage to the zoo structure; a 3-year-old giraffe named Boxer, which had been born at the zoo, was frightened to death by the explosions. Some of the ponds in the park are the remains of bomb craters from this period.

Recent developments

In 1996, a new elephant house and paddock was opened to replace the architecturally outstanding but cramped original elephant house designed by Lubetkin and Tecton in 1935. The old house remains at the zoo as a Grade II* listed building and its associated enclosure contains the zoo's lemurs.

In the early 2000s the zoo added new exhibits including Lions of the Serengeti in 2005, a walk-through lemur enclosure in 2007 (officially opened on 28 March 2007 by Dominic Byrne from The Chris Moyles Show on Radio 1, who is a regular visitor to the park), the Rhinos of Nepal exhibit in February 2007, Cheetah Rock on Easter 2008, a sloth bear exhibit in May 2008, and Wild Wild Whipsnade in May 2009. In July 2008, the Café on the Lake was reopened after remodelling, with its name changed to the Wild Bite Café.

In May 2009, William Windsor (known as Billy), a goat mascot of the British Army's Royal Welsh regiment, retired to the zoo after eight years' distinguished service performing ceremonial duties.

Exhibits

Butterfly House

The Butterfly House opened in 2016, the house is home to various species of butterfly and dwarf crocodiles, it is a walkthrough exhibit so the Butterflies are flying around when people go through the exhibit. This house is also home to one of the largest moths in the world; the atlas moth.

Passage Through Asia

Passage Through Asia is a large paddock with no boundaries between visitors and the animals. Visitors can only access the area by driving through it in their own cars or riding on the Jumbo Express train. The paddock houses herds of Bactrian camels, barasingha, fallow deer, sika deer, Père David's deer and yaks.

Lions of the Serengeti 
Opened in 2005, Lions of the Serengeti was home to a pride of 7 African lions. The pride of African lions included two adult females named Mashaka-Lia and Kachanga, three younger males named Neo, Toto and Max, and a younger female named Kia. The four younger lions are the offspring of Spike, the zoo's former male lion and Mashaka-Lia, and were born in April 2006. In October 2021 Toto died at the age of 15 due to ill health. In December 2021 the remaining lions Neo, Kia and Max were euthanized after age related conditions were beginning to cause them pain and discomfort. The Lion habitat is now closed until a suitable breeding group can be sourced.

In early 2022, the zoo temporarily housed 5 lions named Zero, Tor, Jabu, Mo and Kaya from Africa Alive! Suffolk, after their enclosure suffered damage from Storm Eunice.

From May 2022, the zoo housed Khari, a male lion from the Blackpool Zoo. 
Khari will leave Whipsnade Zoo in 2023 Summer to return to Blackpool Zoo. Whipsnade will Continue to search for an appropriate breeding group.

Sea Lion Splash (closed)

Formerly the zoo's Dolphin Pool, Sea Lion Splash was a daily demonstration in which the zoo's three trained California sea lions (two females named Bailey and Lara, and a male named Dom) perform tricks and stunts in their pool (referred to as the 'Splash Zone'). In June 2015, Dom and Bailey gave birth to a male sea lion called Oscar. In February 2021, the zoo's Sea Lions were transferred to Yorkshire Wildlife Park, in South Yorkshire.

Elephant herd

ZSL Whipsnade Zoo keeps a herd of nine Asian elephants, consisting of cows Lucha, Kaylee, Karishma, Kaylee's female calf Donna, and Bull elephant Ming Jung, who arrived in November 2019 as part of the European Endangered Species Programme. Their paddock is seven acres, and features three pools, mud wallows and dust baths. One of the female elephants, named Karishma, and her pregnancy with her first calf George, featured heavily in the first series of the ITV documentary programme The Zoo, which follows the daily lives of the staff at both Whipsnade and London Zoo. Another female calf was born during the Queen's birthday celebrations and was named Elizabeth. The elephant herd moved to a new indoor facility, the Centre for Elephant Care, which opened in Easter of 2017.

Rhinos of Nepal

Opened in February 2008, Rhinos of Nepal houses a group of four Indian rhinoceros – Hugo, Beluki, Behan and a young male called Bali (born to Behan in September 2015). The building aims to be environmentally friendly, using rain water captured on the roof to fill the pools, heating the pools with solar energy and featuring barriers that are made from recycled wooden railway sleepers instead of metal bars.

Birds of the World
A daily educational show in which keepers present various bird species demonstrating their natural abilities to an audience of visitors.

Cheetah Rock

Opened in 2008, this exhibit is home to a group of cheetahs, and features displays that inform visitors about ZSL's cheetah conservation project in Tanzania. Despite ZSL's conservation project being focused on East Africa, the Cheetahs at Whipsnade are in fact Sudan cheetahs from Northeast Africa.
The zoo is now home to three male cheetahs who moved in 2022 from Ireland.

Children's Farm

An area aimed primarily at children and housing domesticated livestock such as turkeys, llamas, alpacas, cows, silkie chickens, horses, donkeys, and goats, most of which are free-roaming. The Children's Farm is also home to a female Bennett's wallaby named Pip, who was abandoned by her mother and hand-reared by keepers.

Wild Wild Whipsnade
Wild Wild Whipsnade was opened in 2010. This exhibit is home to several species of animal that lived in the wild in Britain hundreds of years ago. These include Eurasian brown bears, wolverines, Eurasian lynx, reindeer, wild boar, and European bison.

Other animals
Other species in the zoo's collection that are not part of a themed exhibit include Amur tigers, blesbok, Asian small-clawed otters, red pandas, great white pelicans, gemsbok, sloth bears, meerkats, aardvarks, Cape porcupines, common ostriches, reticulated giraffes, southern white rhinoceroses, Przewalski's wild horses, chimpanzees, American flamingos, northern rockhopper penguins, Grévy's zebra, African wild dogs, bongo, hippopotamus, pygmy hippopotamus, scimitar-horned oryx, waterbuck, African penguins and ring-tailed lemurs.

Daily shows
The only animal demonstration show is the 'Birds of the World'.

Talks also take place daily throughout the summer season including lemur talks, giraffe browse and penguin feeding.

Funding
The park and ZSL receive no government funding, and rely mainly on entrance fees, memberships, its 'Fellows' and 'Patrons' scheme and various corporate sponsorships. The park takes advantage of the Gift Aid charity donation scheme.

Filming at the zoo
Whipsnade was one of the sets for ITV's Primeval, where a ferocious predator from the future kills a lion and three people. The zoo is one of the locations featured in BBC's Super Vets. It featured in an episode of the CBBC programme Brum in 1991, titled "Safari Park". Jamie Oliver and Sainsbury's have also used the zoo's background for a 2001 television advert. The BBC's Merlin used parts of Whipsnade as a filming location for Season 1, and the famous lion landmark is featured in behind the scenes footage from the DVDs. The zoo also served as one of the tasks for BBC Three's Young, Dumb and Living Off Mum. Tots TV visited Whipsnade.

Criticism
In 2002, a 20-year-old elephant named Anna died three days after giving birth to a stillborn calf. There was an allegation that the elephant suffered painful and unnecessary surgery during the birth. The zoo reported that Anna's death was due to an infection related to the still birth and that she did not "die in agony".

In 2021, two female European brown bears were shot and killed after escaping their enclosure during the night. The zoo was criticized for euthanizing the bears, after they used a fallen tree to escape into an adjacent enclosure where they attacked a wild boar. Sam Threadgill, director of the charity Freedom for Animals said: "It was a tragic incident, but it just highlights again why we shouldn’t be keeping animals in zoos". The zoo's chief curator at the time, Malcolm Fitzpatrick, said in a message to staff, "We must quickly make decisions informed by our experience and expertise to protect our people, guests and our other animals." adding that tranquillizers were not an option as they would have taken 20 minutes to take effect.

Chimpanzee escape
In September 2007, two former 'tea party' chimpanzees named Koko and Jonnie, moved from London Zoo to make way for The Gorilla Kingdom, escaped from their enclosure. Koko followed one of the keepers back to the enclosure but Jonnie started heading towards public grounds. Jonnie was shot dead by the zoo's specially trained firearms squad for fears about public safety. The zoo has said that at no point were any members of the public in danger. When asked why they did not use a tranquilliser instead, ZSL spokeswoman Alice Henchley said "It's just standard procedure, if the animal cannot be quickly and safely recaptured it will be shot. We can't be sure with a tranquillizer".

Popular culture
 In the 1976 movie Rogue Male, which takes place on the eve of WW2, the central character (who has failed in an attempt to assassinate Adolf Hitler) played by Peter O'Toole jeeringly tells the Nazi (John Standing) who catches him if he would donate his remains to Whipsnade Zoo.
 Gerald "Gerry" Durrell, British naturalist, zookeeper, conservationist, author and television presenter also worked here. After the war, Durrell joined Whipsnade Zoo as a junior or student keeper. This move fulfilled a lifelong dream: Durrell claims in The Stationary Ark that the first word that he could enunciate with any clarity was "zoo". Beasts in My Belfry recalls events of this period.

References

Notes
 A set of panels outlining the history of the zoo is located in the Lookout Cafe in the park.

External links

One of a series of aerial photos of Whipsnade Zoo taken in May 1931 on its opening
 Page of ZSL about solutions to environmental problems

Tourist attractions in Bedfordshire
Zoos in England
Buildings and structures in Bedfordshire
Zoological Society of London
Zoos established in 1931
1931 establishments in England